Puna Bhengra is an Indian politician from Bharatiya Janata Party. In May 2021, he was elected as a member of the West Bengal Legislative Assembly from Nagrakata (constituency). He defeated Joseph Munda of All India Trinamool Congress by 14,402 votes in 2021 West Bengal Assembly election.

References 

Living people
Year of birth missing (living people)
21st-century Indian politicians
People from Jalpaiguri district
Bharatiya Janata Party politicians from West Bengal
West Bengal MLAs 2021–2026